Tayla Carolina Pereira dos Santos (born 9 May 1992), known as Tayla or sometimes as Diva, is a Brazilian professional footballer who plays as a defender for Santos and the Brazil national team. She was included in Brazil's squad for the 2015 FIFA Women's World Cup.

Club career
Tayla joined Santos in 2008, after a successful trial. She then spent three seasons with Foz Cataratas in 2010, 2011 and 2012. Ahead of the 2013 season, Ferroviária signed Tayla, Beatriz, Rilany and Thaisa, all from Foz Cataratas in a quadruple transfer deal.

Tayla returned to Santos in 2017, after representing Iranduba and Centro Olímpico. On 14 January 2019 she moved abroad, joining Benfica.

Tayla left Benfica in November 2019, after helping in their top tier promotion and winning the Taça de Portugal Feminina. She returned to Santos for a third spell in January 2020.

International career
At the 2012 FIFA U-20 Women's World Cup, Tayla was part of the Brazilian team. Tayla was called into the senior national team squad for the first time in November 2013, for a friendly against the United States at the Florida Citrus Bowl. She made her senior Brazil women's national football team debut on 11 June 2014, a 0–0 friendly draw with France staged in Guyana.

At the 2014 Copa América Femenina, Tayla scored the fourth goal in Brazil's 6–0 rout of Argentina. In February 2015 she was included in an 18-month residency programme intended to prepare Brazil's national team for the 2015 FIFA Women's World Cup in Canada and the 2016 Rio Olympics. Tayla was withdrawn from Brazil's squad for the 2015 Pan American Games due to injury and was sent back to train with her club.

Career statistics

International

International goals
Scores and results list Brazil's goal tally first.

Honours
Santos
Campeonato Paulista de Futebol Feminino: 2009, 2018
Campeonato Brasileiro de Futebol Feminino Série A1: 2017
Copa Paulista: 2020

Ferroviária
Campeonato Paulista de Futebol Feminino: 2013
Campeonato Brasileiro de Futebol Feminino Série A1: 2014
Copa do Brasil de Futebol Feminino: 2014

Benfica
 Campeonato Nacional II Divisão Feminino: 2018–19
 Taça de Portugal Femininal: 2018–19

References

External links

1992 births
Living people
Women's association football defenders
Brazilian women's footballers
Brazil women's international footballers
Brazilian expatriate women's footballers
2015 FIFA Women's World Cup players
Campeonato Brasileiro de Futebol Feminino Série A1 players
Associação Desportiva Centro Olímpico players
Associação Ferroviária de Esportes (women) players
Santos FC (women) players
S.L. Benfica (women) footballers
Brazilian expatriate sportspeople in Portugal
Expatriate women's footballers in Portugal
2019 FIFA Women's World Cup players